Robert De Friese Evans is a paralympic athlete from the United States competing mainly in category T46 distance events.

Robert competed at the 2000 Summer Paralympics where he was the stand out distance runner in the Men's T46 class winning gold in both the 1500m and 5000m, he was also part of the American 4 × 100 m relay team that was unable to medal.

In the 5000m, Robert ran a world record, beating silver medalist Javier Conde (athlete) and taking the gold.

References

Paralympic track and field athletes of the United States
Athletes (track and field) at the 2000 Summer Paralympics
Paralympic gold medalists for the United States
Living people
Medalists at the 2000 Summer Paralympics
Year of birth missing (living people)
Paralympic medalists in athletics (track and field)
American male middle-distance runners
Middle-distance runners with limb difference
Long-distance runners with limb difference
Paralympic middle-distance runners
Paralympic long-distance runners